Thiorhodovibrio is a Gram-negative genus of bacteria from the family of Chromatiaceae.

References

Chromatiales
Bacteria genera
Taxa described in 1993